The 1992 United States Senate election in South Dakota was held on November 2, 1992. Incumbent Democratic U.S. Senator Tom Daschle won re-election to a second term.

Major candidates

Democratic
 Tom Daschle, incumbent U.S. Senator

Republican
 Charlene Haar, educator

Results

See also
 1992 United States Senate elections

References

South Dakota
1992
1992 South Dakota elections